The list of Hult International Business school people includes notable graduates, professors, and administrators affiliated with the Hult International Business School, located in Cambridge, London, San Francisco, Dubai, New York City, and Shanghai.

Alumni

Business

Media

Politics

Sports

Other

Faculty

Current administration

Current faculty

Former faculty

References 

Hult International Business School